Cunjamba Dima is a city and commune of Angola in Cuando Cubango Province.

See also 

 Communes of Angola

References 

Populated places in Cuando Cubango Province
Municipalities of Angola